The World Allround Speed Skating Championships for Men took place on 14 and 15 February 1987 in Heerenveen at the Thialf ice rink. This was the first international skating tournament to be held in an indoor stadium with the result that 9 world records and 93 personal records were set.

Title holder was the Netherlander Hein Vergeer.

Classification

  * = Fell
  DQ = Disqualified

Source:

References

World Allround Speed Skating Championships, 1987
1987 World Allround

Attribution
In Dutch